Mohammed Takiyudin (born 26 June 1991 in Ghana) is a Ghanaian-born midfielder, who plays for Los Angeles Misioneros in United States.

Career
Takidinho started playing football at youth level in State Envoys and then moved to Feyenoord Ghana. He moved to Feyenoord in 2001 and played for the club 6 years from the under 12 to the senior team with success. In 2007-08 moved to Kessben FC that changed their name to Medeama SC and was invited to Ghana U17. He attend Arizona Western College and played for them. In 2012, he transferred to Sweden and plays for BKV Norrtälje. Then in 2013 he played for the Los Angeles Misioneros in the USA PDL.

Honours

External links
 Festival's "Best soccer player"
 Kessben FC Profile
 Best player award in the Netherlands
 Arizona College Profile
 Signs for BKV
 All-conference second team usa

Video Highlights
 

1991 births
Living people
Association football midfielders
Ghanaian footballers
Medeama SC players
Expatriate footballers in Ghana
Ghanaian expatriate sportspeople in Sweden